George Abel Van Eps (August 7, 1913 – November 29, 1998) was an American swing and mainstream jazz guitarist.

Biography
George Van Eps was born in Plainfield, New Jersey, United States, into a family of musicians. His three brothers – Fred Abel Van Eps, Jr. (1907–1980), Robert B. Van Eps (1909–1986), and John A. Van Eps (1912–1945) – were musicians. His mother, Louise Abel, was a classical pianist and his father, Fred Van Eps, was a ragtime banjoist and sound engineer. George Van Eps began playing banjo when he was eleven years old. After hearing Eddie Lang on the radio, he put down the banjo and devoted himself to guitar. By the age of thirteen, in 1926, he was performing on the radio. Through the middle of the 1930s, he played with Harry Reser, Smith Ballew, Freddy Martin, Benny Goodman, and Ray Noble.

Van Eps moved to California and spent most of his remaining career as a studio musician, playing on many commercials and movie soundtracks.

In the 1930s, he invented a model of guitar with another bass string added to the common six-string guitar. The seven-string guitar allowed him to play basslines below his chord voicings, unlike the single-string style of Charlie Christian and Django Reinhardt. He called his technique "lap piano". It anticipated the fingerpicking style of country guitarists Chet Atkins and Merle Travis and inspired jazz guitarists Bucky Pizzarelli, John Pizzarelli, and Howard Alden to pick up the seven-string.

Dixieland had a following in Los Angeles during the 1940s and 1950s, and he played in groups led by Bob Crosby and Matty Matlock and appeared in the film Pete Kelly's Blues. He played guitar on Frank Sinatra's 1955 album. In the Wee Small Hours.

Van Eps played guitar into his eighties, having built a career that lasted over sixty years. He died of pneumonia in Newport Beach, California, on November 29, 1998 at the age of 85.

Discography

As leader or co-leader
 1949 Jump Presents George Van Eps (Jump)
 1956 Mellow Guitar (Sundazed)
 1965 My Guitar (Euphoria)
 1967 Seven-String Guitar (Capitol)
 1968 Soliloquy (Euphoria)
 1991 Thirteen Strings with Howard Alden (Concord)
 1992 Hand-Crafted Swing with Howard Alden (Concord)
 1993 Seven & Seven with Howard Alden (Concord)
 1994 Keepin' Time with Howard Alden (Concord) 
 1994 Legends (Concord) with Johnny Smith
 2003 George Van Eps, Eddie Miller, and Stanley Wright (Jump)

As sideman
 1947 The Voice of Frank Sinatra, Frank Sinatra
 1953 Jam Session: Coast to Coast, Eddie Condon
 1955 Pete Kelly's Blues, Ray Heindorf
 1955 In the Wee Small Hours, Frank Sinatra
 1956 Casa Loma in Hi-Fi!, Casa Loma Orchestra
 1958 And They Called It Dixieland, Matty Matlock
 1958 Pete Kelly Lets His Hair Down, Matty Matlock
 1960 Swingin' Decade, Casa Loma Orchestra
 1960 Bing & Satchmo, Louis Armstrong/Bing Crosby
 1987 Louis Armstrong & All-Stars 1947–1950, Louis Armstrong
 1987 Sing, Sing, Sing Benny Goodman
 1988 The Complete Columbia Recordings (1949–1953), Sarah Vaughan
 1989 I Gotta Right to Sing the Blues, Jack Teagarden
 1989 Portrait of Bunny Berigan Bunny Berigan
 1992 Easy Jazz, Paul Weston
 1994 It's Magic, Doris Day
 1994 Louis Prima Vol. 1, Louis Prima
 1995 Bouncin' in Rhythm, Adrian Rollini
 1996 The Mel Tormé Collection, Mel Tormé
 1997 Barrelhouse, Boogie, and the Blues, Ella Mae Morse
 1998 Memories of You, Rosemary Clooney
 1998 Swing Era 1927–1947, Gene Krupa
 1998 The Queen of Big Band Swing, Helen Ward
 1999 Happy Holidays: I Love the Winter Weather, Jo Stafford
 1999 Knockin' on Wood, Red Norvo
 1999 Musical Marriage, Peggy Lee
 2000 That Lucky Old Sun, Frankie Laine
 2001 Mr. Silvertone, Freddy Martin
 2002 The All–Stars at Bob Haggart's 80th Birthday Party, Bob Haggart
 2003 Forty Years: The Artistry of Tony Bennett, Tony Bennett
 2006 In Person 1925–1955, Hoagy Carmichael
 2007 John Pisano's Guitar Night, John Pisano

Bibliography

References

1913 births
1998 deaths
Musicians from Plainfield, New Jersey
American jazz guitarists
Seven-string guitarists
20th-century American guitarists
Mainstream jazz guitarists
Swing guitarists
Deaths from pneumonia in California